Tom Wright is an American curler.

He is a  champion, bronze medallist and a two-time United States men's champion (1965, 1968).

Awards
 United States Curling Association Hall of Fame: 1994 (with all 1965 world champions team: skip Bud Somerville, third Bill Strum and second Al Gagne).

Teams

References

External links
 
Curling Superiority!: A History of Superior Wisconsin's Championship Curling Club - Google Books (p. 49)
OOOH, WHAT A DRAWING GAME! | Vault - Sports Illustrated

Living people
American male curlers
World curling champions
American curling champions
Year of birth missing (living people)